EFAMRO is a federation of national bodies representing the market research profession in Europe.

Members

EFAMRO is composed of 16 national bodies:

Activities

EFAMRO has three primary roles:
 To adjudicate on cross-border complaints made against market research organizations through a self-regulatory framework
 To provide a common voice for national bodies when lobbying at a European or international level
 To develop and enhance international quality standards for market research (most notably the ISO 20252 quality standard which EFAMRO initiated)

EFAMRO co-ordinates these activities with other research bodies globally through its participation in the Global Research Business Network (GRBN), a joint initiative with the Asia Pacific Research Committee (APRC) and the Americas Research Industry Alliance (ARIA).

Leadership

EFAMRO is led by an Executive Board overseen by Jan Oostveen (Director General) and Andrew Cannon (President).

External links
 EFAMRO website
 Global Business Research Network (GBRN) website

References

Professional associations based in Belgium
Pan-European trade and professional organizations